Marcelo Vidal (born January 15, 1991) is an Argentine football player who currently plays for Bogotá FC.

Career
Marcelo Vidal joined J2 League club Renofa Yamaguchi FC in 2017.

References

External links

1991 births
Living people
Argentine footballers
Primera Nacional players
Argentine Primera División players
Bolivian Primera División players
J2 League players
Categoría Primera B players
Club Atlético Independiente footballers
Deportivo Merlo footballers
Olimpo footballers
Club Blooming players
Renofa Yamaguchi FC players
Unión Magdalena footballers
Bogotá FC footballers
Association football midfielders
Argentine expatriate footballers
Expatriate footballers in Bolivia
Expatriate footballers in Japan
Expatriate footballers in Colombia